Merlin Edward Fike (February 5, 1925 – February 19, 2018) was an American politician. He was the 24th lieutenant governor of Nevada from 1967 to 1971.

References

1925 births
2018 deaths
Lieutenant Governors of Nevada
Nevada Republicans